Élodie Frégé is a French singer and actress. She was the winner of the third season of Star Academy France. She released her self-titled début album after winning the show.

Career
Frégé auditioned for Star Academy Season 3 and won the title in 2004.

From 2014 to 2015, she was a judge on the 11th season of the reality singing competition show Nouvelle Star.

Discography

Albums

Singles

Filmography

References

External links

 
Official website

1982 births
Living people
People from Nièvre
French people of Italian descent
Star Academy winners
Star Academy (France) participants
French film actresses
21st-century French actresses
21st-century French singers
21st-century French women singers